Tiger Salim is a 1978 Indian Malayalam film, directed by Joshiy and produced by S. R. Shaji. The film stars Sudheer, Vincent, Ravi Kumar, etc. in the lead roles. The film has musical score by Shyam.

Cast
Sudheer as Tiger Salim
Vincent 
Ravikumar 
Shubha 
Balan K. Nair

Soundtrack
The music was composed by Shyam and the lyrics were written by Bichu Thirumala.

References

External links
 

1978 films
1970s Malayalam-language films
Films directed by Joshiy